Kings South is a provincial electoral district in Nova Scotia, Canada, that elects one member of the Nova Scotia House of Assembly. It includes the town of Wolfville, the village of New Minas, the community of Coldbrook, and Glooscap First Nation.

Geography

Members of the Legislative Assembly
This riding has elected the following Members of the Legislative Assembly:

Election results

1956 general election

1960 general election

1963 general election

1967 general election

1970 general election

1974 general election

1978 general election

1981 general election

1984 general election

1988 general election

1993 general election

1998 general election

1999 general election

2003 general election

2006 general election

2009 general election

2013 general election 

|-
 
|Liberal
|Keith Irving
|align="right"| 3,939
|align="right"| 39.25
|align="right"|
|-
 
|New Democratic Party
|Ramona Jennex
|align="right"| 3,568
|align="right"| 35.55
|align="right"|
|-
 
|Progressive Conservative
|Shane MacKenzie Buchan
|align="right"| 2,278
|align="right"| 22.70
|align="right"|
|-

|}

2017 general election

2021 general election

References

External links
Elections Nova Scotia: Electoral District of Kings South
 CBC: riding profile
 June 13, 2006 Nova Scotia Provincial General Election Poll By Poll Results

Nova Scotia provincial electoral districts